Great! Movies Action (stylized as GREAT! movies action) is a British free-to-air TV channel owned by Narrative Entertainment UK Limited which launched as Sony Movies Action on 10 September 2019 on Freeview, Freesat, Sky and Virgin. Sony Movies Action replaced Movies4Men, which was dedicated to showing action, war and western movies as well as showing classic action television series. However, apart from a few 5 minute shorts (such as Soccer Bites or Movie News) Great! Movies Action is now devoted to showing films.

History 
This channel replaced Movies4Men and Movies4Men +1. Sony Movies Action is available on Freeview, Freesat, Sky and Virgin, but the timeshift service Sony Movies Action +1 is only on Sky. Sony Movies Action +1, launched on 25 February 2008, was briefly on Freeview back when it was still known as Movies4Men +1. The channel launched on 13 May 2019 on Freeview channel 48, but was closed the next month because True Entertainment (now Sony Channel) and True Movies (now Sony Movies Classic) were moving to the Local Multiplex. Movies4Men moved to 325 on Sky on May 3, 2012, but moved back to 323 on May 1, 2018 after 6 years.

The Sony Movies Action channel was first announced on 24 July 2019, when Movies4Men would be replaced by Sony Movies Action.

On 14 May 2021, Narrative Capital announced its acquisition of Sony Pictures Television's UK channels; the channel was rebranded as Great! Movies Action eleven days later.

Logos

References

External links
 

English-language television stations in the United Kingdom
Movie channels in the United Kingdom
Sony Pictures Television
Television channels in the United Kingdom
Television channels and stations established in 2019
2019 establishments in the United Kingdom